Project Gotham Racing (PGR) is a series of racing video games developed by Bizarre Creations and published by Microsoft Studios (Xbox and Xbox 360) and Sega (Dreamcast). The series appeared on the Dreamcast, Xbox and Xbox 360 consoles, and consists of Metropolis Street Racer (Dreamcast), Project Gotham Racing (Xbox), Project Gotham Racing 2 (Xbox), Project Gotham Racing 3 (Xbox 360), and Project Gotham Racing 4 (Xbox 360).

Gameplay 
The PGR series have a system called Kudos points. These are given for performing stunts with the vehicle (such as power sliding, overtaking another driver, two wheels, etc.). The longer the stunt is maintained, the more points the player receives. Colliding with the guard rails and other surroundings will cause the Kudos points from that stunt to be lost.

MSR did not support direct network play via SegaNet/Dreamarena, however it did provide some online features. Players could download ghost data and download Hot Lap and Time Trial challenges set by the developers. It also featured rudimentary downloadable content in the form of challenges which featured new racetrack configurations. PGR2, PGR3 and PGR4 supported direct network gameplay via Xbox Live, while the first installment in the series did not.

The cover of each game in the Project Gotham Racing franchise has featured a Ferrari car on it, going from the F50 (PGR) to the Enzo (PGR2), the F430 (PGR3), and the 599 GTB Fiorano (PGR4). The car manufacturer was even the main focus of a free mobile entry in the series, PGR: Ferrari Edition for the Zune HD, similar to that of Porsche in Need for Speed: Porsche Unleashed.

The PGR series is the successor to Bizarre Creation's Dreamcast game Metropolis Street Racer, as evidenced by the similarities and the recycled content between the first Project Gotham Racing and Metropolis Street Racer.

Discontinuation 
In September 2007, after being bought by Activision, Bizarre Creations announced that PGR4 would be the last game produced for Microsoft. Bizarre developed PGR4'''s spiritual successor, Blur, which was released on Xbox 360, PlayStation 3 and Microsoft Windows. As no new PGR'' games were released in the 2010s, and Bizarre Creations was shuttered by Activision in 2011, the franchise is presumed to be discontinued.

Titles

Releases

Reception
All five games in the series received positive reviews from critics.

References

External links

 
Microsoft franchises
Video game franchises
Video game franchises introduced in 2000